Louis Theroux: America's Most Dangerous Pets is a British television documentary film presented by and featuring Louis Theroux. It was first broadcast on 30 October 2011. It was released on Netflix as Beware of the Tiger. It is notable for being the first documentary to feature Joe Exotic, who would later gain worldwide fame as a result of the 2020 Netflix documentary Tiger King: Murder, Mayhem and Madness.

The programme follows Theroux as he travels to the United States to meet people who own animals normally found in America, Africa and Asia, including bears, big cats and dangerous primates. In the programme, Theroux visits GW Exotic Animal Foundation in Oklahoma and meets Joe Exotic.

See also
Shooting Joe Exotic

References

External links 
 

Louis Theroux's BBC Two specials
BBC television documentaries
2011 television specials
British television films
Pets in the United States
Television episodes set in Oklahoma
BBC travel television series
Tiger King